Michael A. Costello (born May 5, 1965, in Lynn, Massachusetts) is a former State Representative for the Massachusetts House of Representatives, who represented the first district of Essex County, Massachusetts. Costello graduated from Salem State University in 1989 with a Bachelor of Science, and from Suffolk University Law School with his Juris Doctor in 1996. Costello served in the House from 2003 to 2014.

Education
As a student at Salem State College (now Salem State University), Costello spent three years organizing and leading a program that resulted in student's building desperately needed housing for some of the poorest Americans living in Appalachia. He also spent a summer working as an intern in the United States Congress.

Costello graduated cum laude from Salem State and went to work as a lay volunteer for the Catholic Diocese of St. Thomas. Later, he served as the Program Director for the Alcoholism and Drug Abuse Association of Boston. While attending Suffolk University Law School, Costello earned academic honors and worked for New Hampshire's Office of the Public Defender.

Early career
After earning his Juris Doctor degree in 1996, Costello worked for Essex County District Attorney Kevin M. Burke. As an Assistant District Attorney, Costello prosecuted hundreds of cases involving the possession and distribution of drugs, domestic violence, assault and battery and robbery.

Costello was elected to the Newburyport City Council as a councilor-at-large in 1997 and, a year later, became field director for Congressman John F. Tierney's (D-Salem) campaign. Following Congressman Tierney's successful election, Costello worked as the chief of staff for State Senator Joan Menard (D-Somerset), former chair of the Massachusetts Democratic Party.

State legislator

Costello was elected to the House of Representatives in November 2002. He served six terms providing representation in the cities of Newburyport, Amesbury and Salisbury in the First Essex District.

During his first term, Costello served on the Joint Committees on Banks and Banking and Insurance. He appeared on the Pat Whitley Radio Show and on New England Cable News with Chet Curtis to discuss insurance issues and the Bank of America merger with Fleet Bank. He now serves as the Chairman of the Joint Committee on Public Safety and Homeland Security and is a member of the Democratic leadership team in the House.

In his role as House Chairman, Costello has taken a leading role on many critical public safety issues. He was one of the lead sponsors of sweeping identity theft legislation designed to safeguard consumers' information and signed into law by Governor Deval Patrick last year. He is a member of the Governor's Anti-Crime Council, which discusses issues like gang violence and the spread of assault weapons. He served on the Governor's CORI Reform Commission, which helped author legislation that will provide meaningful opportunities for people seeking to transition back into society. In a similar capacity, he was named the National Chair of American Bar Association's Re-entry and Collateral Consequences Committee. He was also named the vice president of the Property-Casualty Insurance Committee from the National Conference of Insurance Legislators. In 2007, the Massachusetts Bar Association named Costello its Legislator of the Year.

Within his district, Costello has helped sustain many of the organizations that provide social services in the region, including the Newburyport YWCA, the Pettengill House, the Boys and Girls Club of the Lower Merrimack Valley, the Newburyport Learning Enrichment Center and the Jeanne Geiger Crisis Center. He has also worked to preserve the natural environment and historic resources of the 1st Essex District.

Costello is a member of the board of directors for the Essex County Bar Association and is of Counsel to Andrews and Updergraph Law Firm of Salem.

Costello announced his retirement effective September 15, 2014, to join a law firm.

Family
Costello is the son of former State Senator Nicholas Costello and Cynthia Costello. He is married to Kerrin D'Archangelo of Massachusetts, and they live in Newburyport with their daughter and son.

External links
 Official website of State Representative Michael A. Costello
 Costello's page from Massachusetts House of Representatives' website

References

Politicians from Newburyport, Massachusetts
Politicians from Lynn, Massachusetts
Suffolk University Law School alumni
Members of the Massachusetts House of Representatives
1965 births
Living people
Massachusetts city council members
Salem State University alumni